Michael Peter MacMahon O.P.(1720–20 February 1807) was a Dominican friar and prelate of the Roman Catholic Church born in Limerick, Ireland. He served as Bishop of Killaloe approximately for 42.5 years from 1765 till when he died aged 87 in 1807. He was appointed Bishop on 5 June 1765 and was consecrated on 4 August later that year.

He is one of the longest serving bishop in the history of Diocese of Killaloe. Penal laws were relaxed during his episcopate and made life easier for Catholics. The pectoral cross worn by him is still worn by the Bishop Kieran O'Reilly of the Diocese.

References

External links 

History of the Irish Hierarchy: With the Monasteries of Each County  by Thom Walsh p. 225 
Limerick; Its History and Antiquities, Ecclesiastical, Civil, and Military . by Maurice Lenihan Google books

1720 births
1807 deaths
Clergy from Limerick (city)
18th-century Roman Catholic bishops in Ireland
19th-century Roman Catholic bishops in Ireland
Roman Catholic bishops of Killaloe